Orphnaecus is a genus of tarantulas that was first described by Eugène Louis Simon in 1892. They have close to fifty lanceolate stridulatory spines on the chelicerae, known as "strikers". The male embolus has a single strong retrolateral keel. It is considered a senior synonym of Chilocosmia and Selenobrachys.

Species
 it contains 5 species, four from the Philippines and one from Papua New Guinea:
Orphnaecus adamsoni Salamanes, Santos, Austria & Villancio, 2022 - Philippines 
Orphnaecus dichromatus (Schmidt & von Wirth, 1992) – New Guinea
Orphnaecus kwebaburdeos (Barrion-Dupo, Barrion & Rasalan, 2015) – Philippines
Orphnaecus pellitus Simon, 1892 (type) – Philippines
Orphnaecus philippinus (Schmidt, 1999) – Philippines

See also
 List of Theraphosidae species

References

Theraphosidae genera
Spiders of Asia
Spiders of Oceania
Theraphosidae